William Murray Thompson was a railway contractor and politician in Brisbane, Queensland, Australia. He was Mayor of Brisbane in 1907.

William Thompson was born at Tyrrell, in Cumberland, England in 1841.

He travelled to the gold diggings of New Zealand in the early 1860s and later travelled to Brisbane when gold was discovered in Gympie.

He was a successful railway contractor.

He died on Friday 30 August 1912 at his home.

References

Mayors and Lord Mayors of Brisbane
1841 births
1912 deaths